Pavel Kruglov (born 17 September 1985) is a Russian male volleyball player. He is part of the Russia men's national volleyball team. At the club level, he plays for VC Lokomotiv Novosibirsk.

Sporting achievements

CEV Cup
  2011/2012, with Dinamo Moscow
  2014/2015, with Dinamo Moscow

References

External links
 profile at FIVB.org

1985 births
Living people
Russian men's volleyball players
Universiade medalists in volleyball
Universiade gold medalists for Russia
Medalists at the 2011 Summer Universiade